Hjernen er alene (English:  The Brain is Alone) is the third studio album by Norwegian rock band deLillos. The LP version had a bonus track, not found on the CD release, called "Utkaster" (bouncer).

Track listing
"Fastesangen"
"Vår"
"Sveve over byen"
"Snill og smart"
"Triste dager"
"Balladen om Kåre og Nelly"
"Jenter fra en liten plass"
"Mine peanøtter er ikke gode"
"Skulle bare være morsom"
"Woo doo"
"Utkaster (LP only bonus-track)"
"Parkanlegg her"
"Tikk takk"
"Venter på telefon"
"Rendez-vous"
"Lebestift"
"Hjernen er alene"
"Den feite mannen"
"Mørke Mathilde"
"Soppesmørbrød"
"Kunstig og kulørt"
"Mantra"
"Hva har du tenkt"

Chart performance

References

1989 albums
DeLillos albums
Sonet Records albums